Leeu River, (English: Lion River), The Leeu Taaiboschspruit Catchment is situated in the Greater Sasolburg area in the Free State, South Africa.

See also 
 List of rivers of South Africa
 List of reservoirs and dams in South Africa

Rivers of the Free State (province)